Baetiscidae is a family of mayflies. It contains a single extant genus, Baetisca, native to North America with around 12 species. The family is noted for their spined armoured larvae, which live in flowing water pools and on the edges of streams where they are detritivores, consuming fine particles of organic matter. Two other extinct genera are known, extending back to the Early Cretaceous. They are closely related to Prosopistomatidae which have unusual, beetle-like nymphs as well as the extinct genus Cretomitarcys, with the three groups constituting the clade Carapacea.

Genera
These two genera belong to the family Baetiscidae:
 Baetisca Walsh, 1862 i c g b
 †Balticobaetisca Staniczek & Bechly, 2002 g Baltic amber, Eocene
 †Protobaetisca Staniczek 2007 Crato Formation, Brazil, Early Cretaceous (Aptian)
Data sources: i = ITIS, c = Catalogue of Life, g = GBIF, b = Bugguide.net

References

Further reading

External links

 

Mayflies
Insect families